Royal Consort Suk-ui of the Gim clan (Hangul: 숙의 김씨, Hanja: 淑義 金氏) was a Korean Royal Consort to the Hyojong of Joseon. She had no children with him. After her death, she was promoted to be So-ui (rank senior 2; 소의, 昭儀).

References

Year of birth unknown
Year of death unknown
17th-century Korean people
Royal consorts of the Joseon dynasty